Fabrizio Pinelli (born 4 March 1985 in Torino) is an Italian footballer. He currently plays for F.C. Canavese.

References

F.C. Canavese players
1985 births
Living people
Association football goalkeepers
Italian footballers